César Carlavilla Cubillo (born 9 March 1977) is a paralympic athlete from Spain competing mainly in category T12 middle-distance events.

Carlavilla has competed at two Paralympic games first in 1996 then in 2000.  At the 1996 games he finished second in his only event the T11 1500m.  Four years later in Sydney he improved to gold in T12 1500m and added the T12 800m title, he was also part of the Spanish team that won silver medal in the 4 × 400 m relay for T13 athletes.

References

External links
  (1996, 2000)
  (2002)
 

1977 births
Living people
Spanish male sprinters
Spanish male middle-distance runners
Paralympic athletes of Spain
Paralympic gold medalists for Spain
Paralympic silver medalists for Spain
Paralympic athletes with a vision impairment
Paralympic medalists in athletics (track and field)
Athletes (track and field) at the 1996 Summer Paralympics
Athletes (track and field) at the 2000 Summer Paralympics
Medalists at the 1996 Summer Paralympics
Medalists at the 2000 Summer Paralympics
Visually impaired sprinters
Visually impaired middle-distance runners
Paralympic sprinters
Paralympic middle-distance runners
20th-century Spanish people
Spanish blind people